Hossein Kamyab (born January 4, 1995) is an Iranian footballer who plays as a winger who currently plays for Iranian club Saipa in the Persian Gulf Pro League.

References

Living people
1995 births
Association football midfielders
Iranian footballers
Saipa F.C. players
People from Tehran